Three Days Confined to Barracks (German: Drei Tage Mittelarrest) is a 1930 German comedy film directed by Carl Boese and starring Max Adalbert, Ida Wüst, and Gretl Theimer. The film is a farce set around a military barracks. It was a major hit on its release. It was shot at the Temeplhof Studios in Berlin. The film's sets were designed by the art director Emil Hasler. It was later remade in 1955 under the same title.

Cast
Max Adalbert as Hoffmann
Ida Wüst as Adelheid
Gretl Theimer as Eva
Lucie Englisch as Auguste
Paul Hörbiger as Zippert
Paul Otto as Major von Faber
Alfred Döderlein as Erich Feldern
Fritz Schulz as Max Plettke
Felix Bressart as Franz Nowotni
Hans Hermann Schaufuß as Dr. Strauch
Hugo Fischer-Köppe as Krause
Vicky Werckmeister as Frieda
Hermann Krehan as Storch
Henry Bender as Strabl 
Leo Peukert as Stabsarzt

References

External links

Films of the Weimar Republic
Films directed by Carl Boese
Films produced by Arnold Pressburger
Military humor in film
Films set in the 1900s
German black-and-white films
Cine-Allianz films
German historical comedy films
1930s historical comedy films
Films scored by Nico Dostal
1930s German-language films
1930s German films
Films shot at Tempelhof Studios